Henry Roby may refer to:

 Henry John Roby (1830–1915), English classical scholar and politician
 Henry Albert Roby (1844–1905), American architect